Sakshi Malik (born 3 September 1992) is an Indian freestyle wrestler. At the 2016 Summer Olympics, she won the bronze medal in the 58 kg category, becoming the first Indian female wrestler to win a medal at the Olympics. She is a part of the JSW Sports Excellence Program, along with fellow female wrestlers Vinesh Phogat, Babita Kumari and Geeta Phogat.

Malik had previously won the silver medal at the 2014 Commonwealth Games in Glasgow, and the bronze medal at the 2015 Asian Wrestling Championships in Doha.

Early life
Malik was born on 3 September 1992 in Mokhra village of Haryana's Rohtak district to Sukhbir, a bus conductor with Delhi Transport Corporation, and Sudesh Malik, a supervisor at a local health clinic. According to her father, she was motivated to take up wrestling from seeing her grandfather Badlu Ram, who was also a wrestler. She began training in wrestling at the age of 12 under a coach, Ishwar Dahiya, at an Akhara in Chhotu Ram Stadium, Rohtak. However, there were four people out there namely, Kuldeep Malik, Ishwar Dahiya, Mandeep Singh, and Rajbir Singh who claimed themselves as the coach of Sakshi Malik. Later on, Sakshi herself submitted an affidavit with the sports department, informing that Ishwar Dahiya and Mandeep Singh are her coaches.

Career 

Malik's first success as a professional wrestler in the international arena came in 2010 at the Junior World Championships where she won the bronze medal in the 58 kg  freestyle event. At the 2014 Dave Schultz International Tournament, she won gold in the 60 kg category. And after that, she never stopped and maintained her passion and dedication to the game.

2014 
Malik began her campaign at the 2014 Glasgow Commonwealth Games winning her quarterfinal bout against Edwige Ngono Eyia of Cameroon by a 4–0 margin. In the semifinal, she faced Braxton Stone of Canada whom she defeated 3–1 to assure herself of a medal. Her opponent in the final was Aminat Adeniyi of Nigeria who defeated her 4–0 in a closely contested bout. At the 2014 World Championships in Tashkent, she faced Anta Sambou of Senegal in the Round of 16, and won the bout 4–1. She crashed out of the tournament after a 1–3 loss to Petra Olli of Finland.

2015 
At the 2015 Asian Championships in Doha, Qatar, in a total of five rounds in the 60  kg category, Malik battled through two rounds to finish in the third position and claim a bronze medal. In the first round, she faced Luo Xiaojuan of China but was beaten 4–5 by the fall verdict. She came back strongly in the second round to beat Munkhtuya Tungalag of Mongolia 13–0, before losing in the third round to Yoshimi Kayama of Japan. She was able to clinch the bronze medal in the fourth round, beating Ayaulym Kassymova of Kazakhstan.

2016 

Malik qualified for the 2016 Rio Olympics by defeating China's Zhang Lan in the semifinal of the 58  kg category at the Olympic World Qualifying Tournament in May 2016. At the Olympics, she won her Round of 32 bout against Sweden's Johanna Mattsson and Round of 16 bout against Moldova's Mariana Cherdivara. After losing to the eventual finalist Valeria Koblova of Russia in the quarterfinal, she qualified for the repechage round where she defeated Pürevdorjiin Orkhon of Mongolia in her first bout. She won the bronze medal after an 8–5 victory over the reigning Asian champion Aisuluu Tynybekova of Kyrgyzstan, despite trailing 0–5 at one stage, in the repechage medal playoff, and became India's first female wrestler to win an Olympic medal.

2017 
Sakshi Malik represented 'Colors Delhi Sultans' in the second edition of the Pro Wrestling League held in January 2017. She has also been featured in the women's day campaign called #EveryWomanStrong for her sponsor JSW Group.

2022 

In 2022, she competed at the Yasar Dogu Tournament held in Istanbul, Turkey. She won the bronze medal in her event at the 2022 Tunis Ranking Series event held in Tunis, Tunisia. She then went on to win the gold medal at 2022 Birmingham Commonwealth Games.

Personal life
Malik is currently employed with Indian Railways in the commercial department of its Delhi division, in the Northern Railway zone and she is a part of the JSW Sports Excellence Program. Following her bronze medal win at Rio, she was promoted from senior clerk to gazetted officer rank.

Malik has completed a master's degree in physical education from Maharshi Dayanand University in Rohtak. In September 2016, she was appointed as the university's wrestling director.

In an interview shortly after the Rio Olympics, Malik said she was engaged to be married to a fellow wrestler Satyawart Kadian later in 2016. Satyawart Kadian is also an international level wrestler and has won medals in Asian Games and Commonwealth Games.

Marriage
Sakshi Malik married Indian freestyle wrestler Satyawart Kadian on April 2, 2017.

Awards and recognition
Padma Shri (2017) - fourth highest Indian national honour
Major Dhyan Chand Khel Ratna (2016) - highest sporting honour of India
Promotion to gazetted officer rank by her employer, the Indian Railways.
Class 2 job offer from the Government of Haryana.
500 yd2 land grant from the Government of Haryana.

In popular culture
In 2022, Malik appeared in a short documentary by German broadcaster Deutsche Welle about women in wrestling, featuring young wrestler Payal Sharma. The documentary features Malik training Sharma on her way to be a professional wrestler, as well as a view into Indian culture with regards to traditionally held gender roles and, in particular, women in sports.

Biographies

References

External links

 Sakshi Malik at International Wrestling Database

Living people
1992 births
Sportswomen from Haryana
People from Rohtak
Wrestlers at the 2014 Commonwealth Games
Wrestlers at the 2018 Commonwealth Games
Wrestlers at the 2022 Commonwealth Games
Commonwealth Games gold medallists for India
Commonwealth Games silver medallists for India
Commonwealth Games bronze medallists for India
Wrestlers at the 2016 Summer Olympics
Medalists at the 2016 Summer Olympics
Olympic wrestlers of India
Olympic bronze medalists for India
Olympic medalists in wrestling
Recipients of the Khel Ratna Award
Recipients of the Padma Shri in sports
Commonwealth Games medallists in wrestling
21st-century Indian women
21st-century Indian people
Wrestlers at the 2018 Asian Games
Asian Games competitors for India
Asian Wrestling Championships medalists
Maharshi Dayanand University alumni
Medallists at the 2014 Commonwealth Games
Medallists at the 2018 Commonwealth Games
Medallists at the 2022 Commonwealth Games